The black file snake (Gracililima nyassae), also known commonly as the dwarf file snake or the Nyassa file snake, is a species of snake in the  subfamily Lamprophiinae of the family Lamprophiidae. The species is endemic to Africa.

Taxonomy
Gracililima nyassae is the only species in the genus Gracililima. The species was previously placed in the genera Gonionotophis, Mehelya, and Simocephalus.

Etymology
The generic name, Gracililima is from Latin gracili- meaning "slender" + lima meaning "file". The specific name, nyassae, refers to the type locality, "Lake Nyassa" (= Lake Malawi).

Geographic range
G. nyassae is found in Botswana, Burundi, Democratic Republic of the Congo, Eswatini, Kenya, Malawi, Mozambique, Namibia, Rwanda, Somalia, South Africa, Tanzania, Zambia, and Zimbabwe.

Description
G. nyassae is a small snake. The male is shorter, around  SVL. Dorsally it is dark brown or purplish brown, with pink skin showing between the scales. Unlike the Common File snake, this snake lacks the light dorsal stripe but has the characteristic triangular body, Ventrally it is black to dark olive (uniform phase), or cream-olive to white (bicolored phase).

Diet
G. nyassae preys on skinks and other lizards.

Reproduction
The black file snake is oviparous. The female may lay as many as six eggs.

References

Further reading
Broadley, Donald G.; Tolley, Krystal A.; Conradie, Werner; Wishart, Sarah; Trape, Jean-François; Burger, Marius; Kusamba, Chifundera; Zassi-Boulou, Ange-Ghislain; Greenbaum, Eli (2018). "A phylogeny and genus-level revision of the African file snakes Gonionotophis Boulenger (Squamata: Lamprophiidae)". African Journal of Herpetology 67: 43–60. (Gricililima, new genus).
Boulenger GA (1893). Catalogue of the Snakes in the British Museum (Natural History). Volume I., Containing the Families ... Colubridæ Aglyphæ, part. London: Trustees of the British Museum (Natural History). xiii + 448 PP. + Plates I-XXVIII. (Simocephalus nyassæ, p. 347 + Plate XXIII, figures 2, 2a).
Günther A (1888). "Contribution to the Knowledge of Snakes of Tropical Africa". Annals and Magazine of Natural History, Sixth Series 1: 322–335. (Simocephalus nyassae, new species, p. 328).

Colubrids
Reptiles of South Africa
Reptiles described in 1888
Taxa named by Albert Günther